Międzybórz , also known as Międzybórz Sycowski (until 1886 Medzibor), is a town in Oleśnica County, Lower Silesian Voivodeship, in south-western Poland. It is the seat of the administrative district (gmina) called Gmina Międzybórz.

The settlement was first mentioned in 1228, when it was part of fragmented Poland. From 1313 it was part of the Duchy of Oleśnica, remaining ruled by the Piast dynasty until 1492. The town's name is of Polish origin, meaning "między borami", that is "between forests". It received town privileges in 1637. Since the 19th century it has been a centre of the Polish Protestant faith. As at 2019, the town has a population of 2,341.

Gallery

References

Cities and towns in Lower Silesian Voivodeship
Oleśnica County
Cities in Silesia